Harold Moroni "Hal" Schindler (December 6, 1929 – December 28, 1998) was an American journalist and historian, known for his articles and books on the American west.  Early in his career he also scripted episodes of the television series Death Valley Days and Gunsmoke.  He is best known for his 1966 biography of 19th-century Latter-day Saint Orrin Porter Rockwell.

Biography
Schindler was born in Chicago, Illinois to Moroni Helaman Nephi Schindler and Carolina Margaretta Strickstrock, who were German immigrants.  Shortly afterward they moved to New York City, until 1940 when they moved to Salt Lake City, Utah.  He married Benita "Bonnie" Nixdorf Schindler in 1956 and they had three children.  He was a member of the Church of Jesus Christ of Latter-day Saints (LDS Church).

Schindler had a fifty-year journalism career with the Utah daily Salt Lake Tribune.  Starting as a copyboy in 1945, he rose through the ranks as a police reporter, humor writer, and spent 27 years as a television columnist. He was the editor of the Sunday Arts section and magazine.  He also regularly covered Utah history and current events, producing articles in which he chronicled Utah's history leading to statehood.  He used pioneer journals to create a series on the 150th anniversary of the Mormon pioneers' arrival in the Great Salt Lake Valley.

Schindler died of a heart attack in Salt Lake City on December 28, 1998.

History and publications
Schindler's biography, Orrin Porter Rockwell: Man of God, Son of Thunder,  is considered a definitive work on the Mormon stalwart and controversial lawman.  Published in 1966 by the University of Utah Press, the biography has been reprinted in multiple editions to become its publisher's best-selling book ever.  The book won an Award of Merit from the American Association for State and Local History.

Schindler produced an updated edition of West From Fort Bridger, an account of Western trails predating the Mormon exodus, with Utah historian Will Bagley.  This edition revised and updated the work of the late Western historians J. Roderic Korns and Dale Morgan.

Schindler died while researching and writing a book on the Utah War.

Publications
 In Another Time:  Sketches of Utah History, Utah State University Press, 1998, .
 Orrin Porter Rockwell: Man of God, Son of Thunder. University of Utah Press, 1966: Paperback, 1993. 
 Roderic Korns and Dale L. Morgan, eds., West from Fort Bridger: The Pioneering of Immigrant Trails across Utah, 1846–1850, revised and updated by Will Bagley and Harold Schindler, Logan: Utah State University Press, 1994.

References

External links
 Hal Schindler, Tribute, Salt Lake Tribune
 Tribute by Will Bagley
 

Reviews of Orrin Porter Rockwell: Man of God, Son of Thunder
 Autumn 1967 issue of BYU Studies, by Thomas G. Alexander
 Winter 1983 issue of Dialogue: A Journal of Mormon Thought, by Eugene E. Campbell
 Summer 1984 issue of BYU Studies, by Richard H. Cracroft

1929 births
1998 deaths
20th-century American historians
American male non-fiction writers
American male journalists
Journalists from New York City
American Latter Day Saint writers
American people of German descent
Historians of the Latter Day Saint movement
Historians of Utah
Writers from Chicago
Writers from New York City
Writers from Salt Lake City
The Salt Lake Tribune people
20th-century American biographers
20th-century American male writers
Latter Day Saints from Illinois
Latter Day Saints from New York (state)
Latter Day Saints from Utah
Historians from New York (state)
Historians from Illinois
American male biographers